Crime Diaries: The Candidate is a Spanish-language Mexican crime web television miniseries starring Martín Altomaro, Norma Angélica and Enrique Arreola. The plot is inspired by real-life events with real-life footage inter-cutting with the drama, and revolves around the assassination in Tijuana of presidential candidate Luis Donaldo Colosio from Mexico's ruling PRI party in 1994. The series follows a pair of detectives and Luis's dying widow Diana Laura (Ilse Salas) investigate to unravel the truth.

It was ordered direct-to-series, and premiered on Netflix on March 22, 2019.

Cast
 Martín Altomaro as Raúl Salinas de Gortari
 Norma Angélica as Maria Luisa Martínez
 Enrique Arreola as Manuel Camacho Solís
 Ari Brickman as Carlos Salinas de Gortari
 Alejandro Cuétara as Jorge Mancillas
 Hernan Del Riego as Ernesto Zedillo Ponce de León
 Alberto Guerra as Comandante Federico Benítez
 Jorge Antonio Guerrero as Mario Aburto
 Daniel Haddad as Agente Solis
 Jorge A. Jiménez as Luis Donaldo Colosio Murrieta
 Orlando Moguel as Octavio
 Lisa Owen as Madre Superiora
 Ilse Salas as Diana Laura Riojas de Colosio
 Gustavo Sánchez Parra as Comandante David Rubí Sánchez
 Marco Treviño as Miguel Montes
 Evaristo Valverde as Vicente Mayoral
 Carolina Molva as Monja Joven
 Everardo Arzate as Liebano Saénz

Episodes

Release
Crime Diaries: The Candidate was released on Netflix on March 22, 2019.

See also
1994, Netflix documentary covering same events

References

External links
 
 
 

2010s drama television series
2010s crime television series
2010s Mexican television series
2019 Mexican television series debuts
Spanish-language Netflix original programming